United States gubernatorial elections were held in 1946, in 34 states, concurrent with the House and Senate elections, on November 5, 1946 (September 9 in Maine).

In Idaho, the governor was elected to a 4-year term for the first time, instead of a 2-year term. In New Jersey, this was the last election on a 3-year cycle, before switching to a 4-year term for governors from 1949.

Results

Notes

References

 
November 1946 events in the United States